The 1985–86 season was the 75th season in Hajduk Split’s history and their 40th in the Yugoslav First League. Their 2nd place finish in the 1984–85 season meant it was their 40th successive season playing in the Yugoslav First League.

Competitions

Overall

Yugoslav First League

Classification

Results summary

Results by round

Matches

Yugoslav First League

Sources: hajduk.hr

Yugoslav Cup

Sources: hajduk.hr

UEFA Cup

Source: hajduk.hr

Player seasonal records

Top scorers

Source: Competitive matches

See also
1985–86 Yugoslav First League
1985–86 Yugoslav Cup

References

External sources
 1985–86 Yugoslav First League at rsssf.com
 1985–86 Yugoslav Cup at rsssf.com
 1985–86 UEFA Cup at rsssf.com

HNK Hajduk Split seasons
Hajduk Split